TMEM143 (Transmembrane protein 143) is a protein that in humans is encoded by TMEM143 gene. TMEM143, a dual-pass protein (two transmembrane domains), is predicted to reside in the mitochondria and high expression has been found in both human skeletal muscle and the heart. Interaction with other proteins indicate that TMEM143 could potentially play a role in tumor suppression/expression and cancer regulation.

Gene
Located on the negative strand of human DNA, TMEM143 spans 31,882 base pairs on human chromosome 19 (19q13.33), neighbored by genes Coiled-coil domain containing 114 (CCDC114) and ER lumen protein-retaining receptor 1 (KDELR1).

Transcript
In humans, there are five transcript variants encoded by TMEM143 gene (1-5). Variant 1 is the longest mRNA transcript, with a coding region of 2577 nucleotides (nt) and a total of 8 exons, and possibly most indicative of function. Compared to variant 1, variant 2 (2472 nt, 424 amino acid protein) and variant 3 (2382nt, 394 amino acid protein) lack an in-frame exon in the 5' coding region while variant 4 (2277 nt, 359 amino acid protein) lacks two in-frame exons in the 5’ coding region, all leading to an N-terminally truncated protein. Transcript variant 5 is a non-coding RNA, approximately 2231 nt long, resulting in a transcript candidate for nonsense-mediated mRNA.

Protein
There are four protein isoforms, corresponding to a matching variant. Variant 1 codes for isoform a (the longest protein), and variants 2, 3, 4 code for isoforms b, c, and d, respectively. TMEM143 isoform a is 459 amino acids in length, has a molecular weight of 51.6 kDa and an isoelectric point of 9.7 in humans. A domain of unknown function (DUF3754) is present within which two transmembrane domains reside, 24 and 16 amino acids in length, both helical in nature.  

The transmembrane domains encompass the uncharged region present at amino acids 278 to 302. A predicted mitochondrial target peptide resides at the N-terminus spanning 52 amino acids before the cleavage site between amino acids M-51 and G-52. In addition, phosphorylation sites, both general and kinase-specific, were predicted to be found throughout the protein, indicating the location of the protein inside the cell.

Homology

Orthologs
Orthologs have been identified in more than 85 vertebrate species. No TMEM143 orthologs have yet to be identified in birds.

There are currently 85 ortholog species, however all exist as vertebrates only (with the exception of birds), the most distant being Latimeria chalumnae (coelacanth). DUF3754 appears in a majority of the orthologs, a generally conserved region, with slight amino acid alterations to the sequence. This domain has been found in organisms as diverse as bacteria and archaea, however there are no known orthologs in either organismal domain.

Paralogs
There are no known paralogs for the human TMEM143 sequence.

Expression and function

Tissue presence

Possible human expression of TMEM143 protein occurs in Jurkat cells (T lymphocyte). Organelle association puts TMEM143 in the mitochondria as an integral protein in the membrane, as well as the predicted of presence in the plasma membrane, endoplasmic reticulum, extracellular matrix and the Golgi apparatus.

High expression has been found in the heart and skeletal muscle, as indicated through human expression profiling. Microarray expression of normal human tissues  also predict expression in the heart and skeletal muscle, a 95-97 percentile rank (amongst other tissues tested for normal human expression of TMEM143).

Interactions
Through text mining, TMEM143 is shown to have interactions with seven different proteins in humans: Zinc finger protein 541 (ZNF541), DNA-damage inducible 1 homolog 2 (DD12), Paraneoplastic Ma antigen family-like 2 (PNMAL2), Kelch-like 31(JLHL31), Chromosome 14 open reading frame 28 (C14orf28), Chromosome 14 open reading frame 28 (TRIN71), and Cytoplasmic polyadenylation element binding protein 2 (CPEB).

ZNF541 and PNMAL2, in relation to TMEM143, have been documented as having a role in the allelic loss of q13.3 of chromosome 19. This loss results in documented cases of malignant gliomas, neuroblastomas, and ovarian carcinomas, all suggesting a tumor suppression gene or genes in this region. While TMEM143 is not directly referred to in research in this area, it is present in this region on the chromosome, indicating a potential functional role in humans.

Interactions between TMEM143 and DD12, JLHL31, C14orf28, TRIN71, and CPEB (in humans) have been documented through microarray data. Illustrating predicted gene regulation with different microRNA (miRNA) under ionizing radiation conditions, TMEM143 and DD12, JLHL31, C14orf28, TRIN71, and CPEB all share predicted regulatory miRNAs. TMEM143 has also been found to be associated with adipocyte differentiation. Along with other genes, TMEM143 has been documented as a PPARγ (peroxisome proliferator-activated receptor gamma) target. This indicates the possibility of TMEM143 participation in lipid metabolic pathways and lipid cell differentiation

References 

Human proteins